Rahab (Hebrew: רַהַב‎, Modern: Rahav, Tiberian: Rahaḇ, "blusterer") is used in the Hebrew Bible to indicate pride or arrogance, a mystical sea monster, as an emblematic or poetic  name for Egypt, and for the sea.

Rahab (Hebrew: רָחָב‎, Rachav, "spacious place") is also one of the Hebrew words for the Abyss.

Biblical usage

As primeval sea-monster 

Rahab appears in Psalm 89:10, Isaiah 51:9-10, and Job 26:12. Rahab, in these passages, takes the meaning of primeval, chaotic, multi-headed sea-dragon or Leviathan.

The Babylonians told of a sky-god, Marduk, and a sea-goddess, Tiamat, battling for supreme power over the other gods, in the Enūma Eliš. It has been speculated these two characters in the Babylonian myth are parallel to the creation stories found in the biblical passages containing the name Rahab.

As insolence or pride 
In Isaiah 30:7, rahaḇ becomes a proverbial expression that gives an allusion to the Hebrew etymology insolence.

In the Book of Job, rahaḇ occurs in the Hebrew text and is translated in the King James Version as "proud".

Egypt 
Rahab is a poetical name for Egypt. It might have Egyptian origins that were accommodated to the Hebrew language. However, there is nothing revealing in the Coptic language.

Jewish folklore 
In medieval Jewish folklore, Rahab is a mythical sea monster, a dragon of the waters, the "demonic angel of the sea". Rahab represents the primordial abyss, the water-dragon of darkness and chaos, comparable to Leviathan and Tiamat. Rahab later became a particular demon, inhabitant of the sea, especially associated with the Red Sea.

Modern culture 
Rahab is the official Hebrew name for the planet Neptune in a vote organised by the Academy of the Hebrew Language in 2009.

Several Israel Navy submarines also bear the name, including the fifth Dolphin class submarine slated to enter service in late 2015, the INS Rahav.

In the video game Legacy of Kain: Soul Reaver, the boss character Rahab is a vampire who has evolved into a marine fish-like creature, possibly a reference to the mythic sea monster.

See also 
 Lotan
 Rahab (disambiguation)
 Tannin (monster)
 Yam (god)

References

External links 

Demons in Judaism
Dragons
Jewish legendary creatures
Mythological aquatic creatures
Sea monsters
Tiamat
Leviathan